Maio Creole is the name given to the variant of Cape Verdean Creole spoken mainly in the Maio Island of Cape Verde. It belongs to the Sotavento Creoles branch. It numbers the entire island population which includes a small part which also speaks Portuguese, in 2005, the percentage was 1.36%.

It is the eight and one of the least spoken Cape Verdean Creole and is after Brava and ahead of Boa Vista.

Characteristics
Besides the main characteristics of Sotavento Creoles the Maio Creole has also the following ones:
 The progressive aspect of the present is formed by putting stâ before the verbs: stâ + V.
 The unstressed final vowels  and  frequently disappear. Ex.: cumádr’  instead of cumádri  “midwife”, vilúd’  instead of vilúdu  “velvet”, bunít’  instead of bunítu  “beautiful”, cantád’  instead of cantádu  “sung”.
Ex. jantâ  instead of djantâ  “to dine”, jôg’  instead of djôgu  “game”, but in words like djâ  “already”, Djõ  “John” the sound  remains.

Vocabulary

Grammar

Phonology

Alphabet

References

Maio, Cape Verde